Schweiker v. Chilicky, 487 U.S. 412 (1988), was a United States Supreme Court decision that established limitations on implied causes of action. The Court determined that a cause of action would not be implied for the violation of rights where the U.S. Congress had already provided a remedy for the violation of rights at issue, even if the remedy was inadequate.

In this case, seriously disabled people were wrongfully being denied federal benefits (although, on appeal to an Administrative Law Judge, two-thirds had their payments restored). Although Congress provides for the return of back-pay, no provision is made for pain and suffering or other economic losses. The injured parties sued responsible agency personnel, under the theory that pursuant to Bivens v. Six Unknown Named Agents they could allege a private right of action for deprivation of due process. 

The Court examined whether Congress intended a private right of action under these circumstances, and concluded that if Congress has created a meaningful remedy – even if it is incomplete – then no Bivens-type remedy is available. Special factors counseling hesitation included judicial deference to a combination of: 
 some indication that Congress considered providing a cause of action, and chose not to; and
 the design of some government program containing what Congress considers an adequate remedial mechanism.

Here Congress has provided a great deal of process, and some relief, and has been otherwise silent as to a remedy, which the Court found to be enough to foreclose a Bivens remedy.

See also
 List of United States Supreme Court cases, volume 487
 List of United States Supreme Court cases
 Lists of United States Supreme Court cases by volume
 List of United States Supreme Court cases by the Rehnquist Court

External links

United States Supreme Court cases
United States Supreme Court cases of the Rehnquist Court
1988 in United States case law
Implied constitutional cause of action case law